"Looking at the Front Door" is a single by hip hop group Main Source, released on October 25, 1990, from their debut album Breaking Atoms. The song, which contains a sample of "Think Twice" by Donald Byrd, depicts disheartening romantic strife in its lyrics. It peaked at number one on Billboards Hot Rap Songs chart for three consecutive weeks.

Track listing

12" single
A-side
"Looking at the Front Door" (Vocal)
"Looking at the Front Door" (Instrumental)

B-side
"Watch Roger Do His Thing" (Vocal)
"Watch Roger Do His Thing" (Instrumental)

Charts

References

1990 singles
1990 songs
EMI Records singles
Main Source songs
Song recordings produced by Large Professor
Songs written by Large Professor